Hasselbach is an Ortsgemeinde – a municipality belonging to a Verbandsgemeinde, a kind of collective municipality – in the Rhein-Hunsrück-Kreis (district) in Rhineland-Palatinate, Germany. It belongs to the Verbandsgemeinde of Kastellaun, whose seat is in the like-named town.

Geography

Location
The municipality lies in the Hunsrück, in a dale between the Gimbach and, coming from Hundheim, the Hundheimer Bach. These two brooks flow together within Alterkülz’s municipal limits and the resulting stream is thereafter known as the Külzbach. The greater part of the outlying countryside within Hasselbach’s municipal limits is sloped.

History

In 1310, Hasselbach had its first documentary mention in the Sponheimisches Gefälleregister, a taxation register kept by the County of Sponheim.

Beginning in 1794, Hasselbach lay under French rule. In 1815 it was assigned to the Kingdom of Prussia at the Congress of Vienna. Since 1946, it has been part of the then newly founded state of Rhineland-Palatinate.

Hasselbach became well known in the years from 1983 to 1989 for the peace movement’s Easter Marches (Ostermärsche), inspired by the Aldermaston Marches in the United Kingdom, which were always held at Easter. Marchers were protesting the stationing of cruise missiles proposed within the framework of the NATO Double-Track Decision for the nearby Pydna Missile Base.

Hasselbach’s former town hall, built in 1750, was dismantled in 1977 when it became unusable. It was then reassembled in 1978 and 1979 at the Rheinland-Pfälzisches Freilichtmuseum Bad Sobernheim (“Rhineland-Palatinate Open-Air Museum at Bad Sobernheim”). The upper floor houses a small room that was once the council chamber, and the lower floor has been restored to its original use – a bakehouse. In earlier days, when the town hall was still in Hasselbach, a system was established laying out how the order of the bakehouse users was to be determined. Lots were also drawn to determine who had to fire the ovens up and who had to clean the bakehouse up.

In 1954, a lot was acquired for the new municipal administration building, but only in 1964 could work on it begin. On 4 May 1968, the new building was dedicated. Sweeping renovations and conversions were undertaken in 1987 and 1988.

Politics

Municipal council
The council is made up of 6 council members, who were elected by majority vote at the municipal election held on 7 June 2009, and the honorary mayor as chairman.

Mayor
Hasselbach's mayor is Sascha Eisinger.

Coat of arms
The German blazon reads: Schild gespalten durch blaue Wellenleiste, vorn rot-silber geschachtet, hinten grüner Haselnusszweig in Gold.

The municipality's arms might in English heraldic language be described thus: An endorse wavy azure between chequy of twenty-one argent and gules and Or a hazel twig bendwise slipped, leafed of three and fructed of two, all proper.

Earlier forms of the placename Hasselbach, such as Hasilbach and Haselbach, derived from Hasala, an old word for “hazel shrub” (“hazel” is Hasel in Modern High German). The charge on the sinister (armsbearer's left, viewer's right) side, a hazel twig with leaves and nuts, is thus canting. The silver and red “chequy” pattern on the dexter (armsbearer's right, viewer's left) side refers to Hasselbach's former allegiance to the County of Sponheim, and more specifically to its former inclusion in that county's Amt of Kastellaun. Between the two sides is a wavy “endorse” (a much slimmer version of a pale) standing for a brook, or Bach in German, thus referring to the last syllable in the placename Hasselbach.

The arms have been borne since 27 October 2009.

Culture and sightseeing

Buildings
The following are listed buildings or sites in Rhineland-Palatinate’s Directory of Cultural Monuments:
 Dorfstraße 11 – timber-frame building house, half-hipped roof, early 19th century
 Dorfstraße 16 – timber-frame house, partly solid and slated, half-hipped roof, earlier half of the 19th century; timber-frame stable, partly brick, about 1900
 At Dorfstraße 33 – Late Classicist door with skylight, mid 18th century

Sport and leisure
Ever since 1996, a great tent city has arisen around Hasselbach each year in August to lodge those attending the open-air electronic music festival Nature One.

On the Gartenroute Hunsrück-Mittelrhein, a vast garden belonging to Hasselbach’s old schoolhouse can be visited. The schoolhouse itself today houses a museum displaying toys from the last 150 years.

Just beyond the village’s outskirts runs the “Schinderhannes Cycle Path”.

Further reading
Hasselbach im Hunsrück, Spurensuche von Doris Wesner; Herausgeber: Ortsgemeinde Hasselbach.

References

External links

 Municipality’s official webpage 

Municipalities in Rhineland-Palatinate
Rhein-Hunsrück-Kreis